Walpurgis Night (Swedish: Valborgsmässoafton) is a 1935 Swedish drama film directed by Gustaf Edgren and starring Lars Hanson, Karin Kavli, Victor Sjöström and Ingrid Bergman. It was shot at the Råsunda Studios in Stockholm and on location around the city. The film's sets were designed by the art director Arne Åkermark.

Cast
 Lars Hanson as Johan Borg
 Karin Kavli as 	Clary Borg 
 Victor Sjöström as 	Fredrik Bergström
 Ingrid Bergman as Lena Bergström
 Erik 'Bullen' Berglund as Gustav Palm 
 Sture Lagerwall as Svensson
 Marie-Louise Sorbon as 	Mrs. Svensson
 Georg Rydeberg as Frank Roger
 Georg Blickingberg as Landberg
 Richard Lund as 'Doctor' Smith
 Linnéa Hillberg as Nurse
 Stig Järrel as 	Grane
 Gabriel Alw as 	Clary's New Admirer
 Greta Berthels as 	Maid
 Allan Bohlin as 	Bergström Jr.
 Carl Deurell as 	Entrepreneur
 Pekka Hagman as Legionnaire
 Harry Hednoff as 	Legionnaire
 Folke Helleberg as 	Bergström's Son
 Anders Henrikson as 	Paavo
 Torsten Hillberg as 	Detective
 Ivar Kåge as 	Speaker at Walpurgis Celebration
 Hjalmar Peters as Detective
 Carl Ström as Office Manager
 Aino Taube as 	Lena's Friend
 Åke Uppström as 	Telegram Boy
 Olof Widgren as 	Reporter
 Torsten Winge as 	Photographer
 Carl-Gunnar Wingård as 	Boman

References

Bibliography 
 Larsson, Mariah & Marklund, Anders. Swedish Film: An Introduction and Reader. Nordic Academic Press, 2010.
 Noack, Frank. Veit Harlan: The Life and Work of a Nazi Filmmaker. University Press of Kentucky, 2016.
 Santas, Constantine & Wilson, James M. The Essential Films of Ingrid Bergman. Rowman & Littlefield, 2018.

External links 
 

1935 films
1935 drama films
Swedish drama films
1930s Swedish-language films
Swedish black-and-white films
Films directed by Gustaf Edgren
1930s Swedish films